The Train to Busan film series consists of South Korean action-horror zombie films, developed and produced by Next Entertainment World. The installments include a theatrical movie, an animated prequel that was released in theaters in the international market, and a standalone sequel that had a limited theatrical release. Based on an original story by Park Joo-suk, the premise centers around a zombie epidemic outbreak that originates in South Korea. Each respective installment details the struggles of the primary characters to withstand the advances of the undead, and survive the events to make their escape.

The original movie was met with critical and box office success. The prequel was also met with positive critical reception, with praise directed at its expansion to the story; while it also attained monetary gains for the studios. The sequel however, received mixed reviews from critics with the movie being perceived as inferior to its predecessors. Despite its overall reception, and being released during the COVID-19 coronavirus pandemic impact on the film industry, it was a success financially.

The franchise will continue, with an American remake in pre-production, and a sequel movie from Yeon Sang-ho in development.

Films

Train to Busan (2016) 

A man named Seok-woo, his estranged daughter Su-an, and other passengers become trapped on a speeding train in South Korea during a zombie outbreak. As the passengers become overtaken by the undead passengers, and gradually become infected, the number of defenders dwindle as the safety of available space within the railroad vehicle dwindles. With each station at each stop proves to also be overtaken, the train continues along as its passengers hope to escape before they are all infected. Despite insurmountable odds, the father-daughter duo fight to survive by mending their relationship and creating alliances with the remaining passengers, all while overcoming the rising forces of the army of undead plaguing the limited train space.

Seoul Station (2016) 

Prior to the events of the zombie outbreak in Busan, Hye-sun and her boyfriend Ki-woong arrive at a train station in Seoul, South Korea. Hye-sun, who recently escaped her life of slavery at a brothel, now lives with Ki-woong in a troubled relationship. As they face financial troubles, Ki-woong approaches Hye-sun with plans to procuring her for services on an adult online website. As their argument at the station begins, the pair separate just as a bloodied homeless man stumbles into the train station area and collapses. The man's younger brother frantically asks onlookers for help, though they are repulsed by the lack of cleanliness and social status of the men; the ailing man is left alone to die. This quickly changes however, when the man reanimates and attacks the crowd in a ravenous frenzy. As the infection begins to spread to those who are bitten, Hye-sun witnesses the ongoing bloodbath, while Ki-woong's search is intensified when her father Suk-gyu arrives looking for her. As the trio reunites, they fight for survival and race to stay ahead of the pandemonius epidemic. As their window for escape narrows, militant officials assemble to contain what the interpret as an insurrection. Despite their differences, the family struggles to board a train and avoid the ongoing attacks from the undead.

Train to Busan Presents: Peninsula (2020) 

As a zombie epidemic quickly spreads over South Korea and the country is defeated in a day, Korean Marine Jung-seok races to get his family to a ship to escape the outbreak. The family passes a couple with a young daughter that pleads for assistance, though they leave them behind in their frantic escape. The passengers aboard the ship begin to succumb to similar ailments including Jung-seok's nephew. As his sister refuses to leave her child, Jung-seok is left to lock down the quarters to save the rest of the ship. As military officials arrive, his brother-in-law named Chul-min watches on mournfully watching his wife and son die. He resentfully states that Jung-seok should have done more to save his family. The forces of the world quarantine South Korea and lockdown its borders.

Four years later, the guilt-ridden pair are approached by a criminal mob group in Hong Kong, China to infiltrate South Korea to retrieve a truck filled with US$20 million. As the group creates a plan to reach their goal, Jung-seok and Chul-min negotiate half of the money as their earnings. Upon arrival, the team is ambushed and overtaken by a rogue militia named Unit 631, and an attracted army of undead. As Unit 631 escapes with the truck of money, Jung-seok and Chul-min are separated in the chaotic events. Jung-seok is rescued by two young girls, Joon and Yu-jin, who drive him back to their sanctuary community. As he meets with their mother and grandfather, Min-jung and Elder Kim, respectively, he quickly learns that she was the woman who begged him for help and he chose to leave behind four years ago. The group devise a plan to retrieve the money-filled truck from the criminal military that took it, by infiltrating their arena of underground zombie survival games; after which they will escape the country. In the course of events Jung-seok learns that Chul-min is alive and held therein, and sets out to rescue his estranged brother-in-law.

As the events escalate, he fights with determination to keep the members of his team alive, and seeks to redeem his mistake in leaving them behind years before. As they fight for survival against the advances of the undead, they race against the clock when an arriving helicopter will provide their escape.

Future

The Last Train to New York (2023)

In September 2018, an English language adaptation of Train to Busan was announced to be in development. Following a competitive bidding war for the distribution rights to the project, New Line Cinema was announced to serve the distributing company.

In February 2021, it was announced that the film will be directed by Timo Tjahjanto, with a script written by Gary Dauberman, the premise will reportedly follow the plot of the original film. The project will be a joint-venture production between New Line Cinema, Atomic Monster Productions, Gaumont Film Company, and Coin Operated Productions. James Wan, Michael Clear, Nicolas Atlan, Terry Kalagian, and Dauberman will serve as producers. In November 2021, the title was officially revealed to be The Last Train to New York. In December of the same year, Yeon Sang-ho stated that the film would be a reimagined interpretation inspired by the original, as opposed to a direct remake.

The Last Train to New York was originally scheduled to be released theatrically on April 21, 2023; though this was changed to an as-of-yet unspecified date.

Peninsula sequel (TBA)

In August 2020, Yeon Sang-ho confirmed plans to continue the film series with various films set within the same Train to Busan universe, while announcing development on another film had begun. Sang-ho stated that though he may not direct the film, he is involved with the project. In November 2021, the filmmaker stated that after considering expanding the film series into a franchise with a potential television series, film industry conditions on Korea made him decide on making another film. Sang-ho elaborated that work on the third film is ongoing while stating that the plot will be restricted to a confined space more similar to the first film, as opposed to the action-packed sequences of the second movie.

Principal cast and characters

Additional crew and production details

Reception

Box office and financial performance

Critical and public response

References 

Horror film series
South Korean film series
Film series introduced in 2016